Southland is a region in the South Island of New Zealand. It contains numerous rural primary schools, several small town primary and secondary schools, and some big city schools in Invercargill.

The rolls given here are those provided by the Ministry of Education, and are based in June 2011 roll return figures.

Southland District

Former schools
Brydone School was a coeducational years 1-6 primary school in Brydone, between Edendale and Mataura, which closed voluntarily in July 2007. Its student numbers had declined to six.
Blackmount School, located in Blackmount, closed in July 2014 after 103 years of operation when the roll fell to three.
Dacre School, Dacre, closed March 2008.
Mataura Island School was located in the farming district of Mataura Island situated 16 km south of Wyndham. The school closed voluntarily at the end of 1998.
Seaward Downs School - located in the Seaward Downs farming district, 7.9 km south of Edendale closed in the 1970s. Since 1980 the site has been used as the Seaward Downs Playgroup.
Waimahaka School was located in Waimahaka. The school was once a three teacher school but the roll fell to just four students in 2012. The school closed at the end of 2012.
Isla Bank School was located in Isla Bank, 36 km from Invercargill. The roll had decreased to only 10 students and the school closed in 2018.

Gore District

Closed schools
Kaiwera School, Kaiwera, closed July 2008.
Waimumu School, Waimumu operated from 1888 to c.1996.
Willowbank School, closed March 2016

Invercargill City

Former schools
Aurora College
Cargill High School, closed and merged with Kingswell High School at the end of 1998. Site now used by Te Wharekura o Arowhenua.
Kingswell High School, renamed to Mount Anglem College at beginning of 1999.
Mount Anglem College, renamed to Aurora College in January 2005.
Clarendon Primary
Clifton Primary
Collingwood Intermediate
 Became a junior campus for southland boys high school in 2005 for two terms 
 Donovan primary is now on the former site
Fernworth Primary School
Elston Lea Primary, closed and merged with St George Primary in January 2005.
St George Primary, renamed to Fernworth Primary in January 2005.
Grasmere Primary
Hawthorndale Primary School
 Merged with Lithgow intermediate in 2004 becoming ascot community school. It's former site I where the Hawthorndale care village is being constructed.
Kew Primary School
Lithgow Intermediate
 Merged with Hawthorndale Primary in 2004 to become ascot community school which is located on the former site of Lithgow intermediate.
Newfield Primary
Rockdale Park Primary
Rosedale Intermediate, closed at the end of 2004; site now used as the James Hargest Junior Campus.
Southland Technical College
South School
Surrey Park Primary 
 The site I now used as an ECE center 
Tweedsmuir Intermediate, closed at the end of 2004; site now used as Southland Girls High School's east wing.
Waikiwi Primary, merged to Grasmere Primary in 2005.
West Plains School, opened c.1882, merged to Grasmere Primary in 2005.

References
General
Te Kete Ipurangi Ministry of Education website
ERO school and early childhood education reports Education Review Office
Decile change 2007 to 2008 for state & state integrated schools

Specific

 
Southland